Paradoxomyces is a genus of lichenized fungi in the family Arthoniaceae. This is a monotypic genus, containing the single species Paradoxomyces nymanii.

References

Arthoniomycetes
Lichen genera
Monotypic Ascomycota genera
Taxa described in 1996